George Edward Read (1814/1815 – 23 February 1878) was a British mariner, trader, landowner and politician in Poverty Bay, New Zealand. Known as Captain Read, he settled in Gisborne after a career in whaling, setting up a store in what was then a small town.

Early life 
Read was born in Mendlesham, Suffolk, England, in either 1814 or 1815. Little is known of his early life. He came to the Pacific in the 1830s on a whaling ship, and worked on trading ships.

Poverty Bay 
Read first arrived in the settlement of Tūranga in 1844. By 1852, he owned a schooner, and was a prominent trader and landowner.

Member of Parliament 

Following the general election held on 6 January 1876, he represented the East Coast electorate until 22 August, when he was unseated on a petition.

Read died at his home in Gisborne on 23 February 1878.

References

1814 births
1878 deaths
Members of the New Zealand House of Representatives
New Zealand businesspeople
People from the Gisborne District
People from Mid Suffolk District
English emigrants to New Zealand
New Zealand MPs for North Island electorates
19th-century New Zealand politicians